Ken Marschall (born October 28, 1950) is an American painter and illustrator notable for his paintings of famous ocean liners, such as the , , and the , and other transportation vessels including the Bismarck, LZ 127 Graf Zeppelin and LZ 129 Hindenburg. His paintings have been used in many books about the Titanic, most notably his depictions of the sinking, of which no photographs that could be used were taken.

Marschall has served as consultant to many works about the Titanic, including James Cameron's Ghosts of the Abyss, as well as Cameron's film of the same name, the two-part A&E television specials Death of a Dream and The Legend Lives On, and the video game Titanic: Honor and Glory.

References

External links
Official website

Artist Biography 

1950 births
20th-century American painters
American male painters
21st-century American painters
21st-century American male artists
Living people
Place of birth missing (living people)
20th-century American male artists